Equus neogeus is an extinct species of equine native to South America during the Pleistocene. It was formerly thought to be several distinct species within the subgenus Amerhippus, but was later shown to be a single morphologically variable species. It is thought to be closely related to true horses.

Taxonomy 
While they have formerly been referred to as belonging to 5 separate species, this has been revised down into three, and more recently a single, morphologically variable species Equus neogeus.  A 2008 study of mitochondrial DNA fragments of a specimen of E. neogeus found it to be nested within mitochondrial lineages of E. caballus, however, later studies suggested that this result required more specimens to be analysed for confirmation. A close relationship to caballine horses was also supported by a 2019 morphological analysis study.

Description 

Distribution 
They were one of two groups of equines in South America, alongside Hippidion. Fossils have been recovered from the Tarija Formation of Bolivia, the Serranía del Perijá in Venezuela, the Chiu-Chiu Formation of Chile, the Sabana Formation of the Bogotá savanna in Colombia, and from various locations in Ecuador. Equus neogeus first appeared in South America during the late Early Pleistocene-earliest Middle Pleistocene, around 1 to 0.8 million years ago, based on remains found near Tarija, Bolivia. The youngest remains date to approximately 11,700 years Before Present, in Río Quequén Salado, in the southwest of Buenos Aires province, Argentina.

Paleobiology 
A 2019 study suggested that Equus neogeus was primarily a grazer that fed on both C4 and C3 grasses in prairies and open woodlands.

References

Pleistocene horses
Pleistocene mammals of South America
Lujanian
Ensenadan
Uquian
Pleistocene Bolivia
Fossils of Bolivia
Pleistocene Chile
Fossils of Chile
Pleistocene Colombia
Fossils of Colombia
Pleistocene Ecuador
Fossils of Ecuador
Pleistocene Venezuela
Fossils of Venezuela
Fossil taxa described in 1950
Taxa named by Robert Hoffstetter
Animal subgenera
Equus (genus)
Pleistocene Argentina